Al Bunayyat al Janubiyah  is a town in the Amman Governorate of north-western Jordan.

It is located south-west of Amman the capital of Jordan.

Climate
Climate type is characterized by extremely variable temperature conditions.  The Köppen Climate Classification subtype for this climate is "Bsh". (Mid-Latitude Steppe and Desert Climate).

References

External links
Satellite map at Maplandia.com

Populated places in Amman Governorate